Forty Eight Hours to Acapulco (German: 48 Stunden bis Acapulco) is a 1967 West German crime film directed by Klaus Lemke and starring Dieter Geissler, Christiane Krüger and Monika Zinnenberg.  Location shooting took place in Bavaria, Italy and Mexico.

Cast
 Dieter Geissler as Frank Murnau
 Christiane Krüger as Laura Gruner
 Monika Zinnenberg as Monika
 Alexander Kerst as Vater Gruner
 Charly Kommer as Amerikanischer Gangster
 Manuel Rivera	
 Lyn Guild as Dienstmädchen bei Mr. Wayne 
 Lucas Hernandez
 Roberto Lopez
 Ilse Pagé as Mädchen auf Gruners Party
 Michael Maien as Monikas Tischnachbar
 Teddy Stauffer as Mr. Wayne
 Roland Carey as Mr. Cameron
 Gideon Bachmann as Mann an der Bar in Rom 
 Elke Haltaufderheide 	
 Rudolf Thome as Angreifer

References

Bibliography
 Bock, Hans-Michael & Bergfelder, Tim. The Concise Cinegraph: Encyclopaedia of German Cinema. Berghahn Books, 2009.

External links

1967 films
1967 crime films
German crime films
West German films
1960s German-language films
Films directed by Klaus Lemke
Films set in Mexico
1960s German films